The Asia/Oceania Zone is one of the three zones of regional Davis Cup competition in 2012.

In the Asia/Oceania Zone there are four different groups in which teams compete against each other to advance to the next group.

Participating nations

Seeds:
  (second round)
 

Remaining Nations:

Draw

 relegated to Group II in 2013.
 and  advance to World Group Play-off.

First round

New Zealand vs. Uzbekistan

South Korea vs. Chinese Taipei

China vs. Australia

Second round

Uzbekistan vs. India

Australia vs. South Korea

First round play-off

Chinese Taipei vs. China

New Zealand vs. India

Second round play-off

Chinese Taipei vs. New Zealand

References

External links
Official Website

Asia Oceania Zone I
Davis Cup Asia/Oceania Zone